Eresiomera cornucopiae is a butterfly in the family Lycaenidae. It is found in Gabon.

References

Butterflies described in 1892
Poritiinae
Butterflies of Africa